Naarda clitodes is a type of moth in the family Erebidae. It was described by David Stephen Fletcher in 1961.

This species is known from Uganda.

References

Herminiinae
Moths described in 1961